Richard Lee was a public relations worker for the Anaheim Amigos of the American Basketball Association during the 1967-68 season.  He eventually found himself on the Amigos' active playing roster as the team struggled with finances and injuries.

The Anaheim Amigos were one of the least successful teams in the ABA.  Attendance at their games was rumored to dip into double-digits, and the team ultimately lost about $500,000 before being sold and moved to Los Angeles.  Injuries struck the Amigos towards the end of the 1967-68 season, but the team was so strapped financially that they could not sign any established basketballers as replacements.  In order to have a full roster, team owner Art Kim decided to activate PR man Dick Lee as a player.  Though Lee was not expected to receive any playing time, the Amigos coach was forced to use him in two games because Lee's teammates were in foul trouble.  Playing at the forward position, Lee grabbed one rebound and is credited with one assist. Lee played college basketball at the University of Washington.

Sources
Pluto, Terry. Loose Balls. New York: Fireside, 1990.

External links
Professional statistics at basketball-reference.com
Anaheim Amigos history at Remember the ABA

Year of birth missing (living people)
Living people
American men's basketball players
Anaheim Amigos players
Ballard High School (Seattle, Washington) alumni
Basketball players from Seattle
Forwards (basketball)
Washington Huskies men's basketball players